Ensign Lake is a lake in Lake County, in the U.S. state of Minnesota.

Ensign Lake was named for Josiah D. Ensign, a local judge.

See also
List of lakes in Minnesota

References

Lakes of Minnesota
Lakes of Lake County, Minnesota